Marco Platania (born 6 May 1973, in Cremona) is a former Italian rugby union player. He played as a centre.

Platania played for Amatori Rugby Milano, from 1991/92 to 1997/98, winning 3 titles of the Italian Championship, in 1992/93, 1994/95 and 1996/97, and the Cup of Italy in 1994/95. He moved to Amatori & Calvisano, where he stayed from 1998/99 to 2000/01. He left sports aged only 28 years to pursue a professional career as an engineer, having graduated shortly before.

Platania had 4 caps for Italy, from 1994 to 1996, scoring 2 tries, 10 points on aggregate. He was called for the 1995 Rugby World Cup but he never played. He also played for Italy A.

References

External links

1973 births
Living people
Italian rugby union players
Italy international rugby union players
Amatori Rugby Milano players
Rugby Calvisano players
Rugby union centres